The Klein Ministry was the combined Cabinet (called Executive Council of Alberta), chaired by Premier Ralph Klein, and Ministers that governed Alberta from the mid-point of the 22nd Alberta Legislature from December 14, 1992, to the mid-point of the 26th Alberta Legislature until December 14, 2006.

The Executive Council (commonly known as the cabinet) was made up of members of the Progressive Conservative Party of Alberta which held a majority of seats in the Legislative Assembly of Alberta. The cabinet was appointed by the Lieutenant Governor of Alberta on the advice of the Premier.  Members of the council are styled "the Honourable" only for the duration of their membership, not for life.

Klien's last cabinet was sworn in on November 24, 2004, following the 26th Alberta general election. There was a cabinet shuffle on April 6, 2006, to fill vacancies caused by  Lyle Oberg's dismissal and Ed Stelmach's resignation.

Members of the final Klein cabinet are listed in order of precedence.

Klein cabinet

See also
Executive Council of Alberta
List of Alberta provincial ministers

External links
News release - Klein names new Cabinet, reorganizes some portfolios

Politics of Alberta
Executive Council of Alberta
1992 establishments in Alberta
2006 disestablishments in Alberta
Cabinets established in 1992
Cabinets disestablished in 2006